This list of football teams in Bulgaria, contains football clubs that have recently been and/or still are members of the Bulgarian Football Union.

Overview
The list consists of sports clubs that in recent years have been members of the Bulgarian Football Union (BFU). For a club to be a member of the BFU it has to endeavour in practising and/or developing football on the territory of Bulgaria. Thus, for a club to be a member of the BFU it is sufficient for it to have an active football youth academy, without sustaining any football team to participate in the tournaments organised by the BFU. Nevertheless, most members of the union do form a football team and almost all of them have a representative team for the men's football tournaments organised by the BFU.

Names
Some clubs in the list have undergone slight name changes for administrative or technical purposes but still have the same representative team. (For example Lokomotiv 1926 (Plovdiv) in the list throughout the years has been officially named NFC Lokomotiv (Plovdiv), FC Lokomotiv Plovdiv 1936, PFC Lokomotiv 1926 Plovdiv, etc.) Thus, the official name of a football club may differ slightly from the one in the list.

Membership and Participation
For a football club to be a member of the Bulgarian Football Union it is sufficient to engage in activities developing the sport, but not actively participating in the tournaments organised by the governing body. Thus a club may not have a participating team in the men's football leagues considered in the list but still be a member of the union. A club may have its membership revoked by the Executive Committee of the BFU if it has not practised and/or developed football in Bulgaria for more than two years.

In the list, teams marked as Does Not Participate in the Level tab, may only have a youth academy, or women's or children's teams, or have stopped engaging in football altogether since the last Assembly of the Executive Committee of the BFU. Also, there were 182 clubs with revoked memberships and 103 clubs accepted as members of the union on the Assembly that was held on 14 February 2014, but information on the teams is not readily available to the public from the Bulgarian Football Union or the Bulgarian Professional Football League. Still, some of the teams may have ended the life-cycle of their legal personality (the registered football club), yet reapplied for membership in the BFU under a different legal body (a newly formed club successor of the previous), causing re-licensing and slight change of name but continuation of the team.

Levels
The football clubs in the list are divided into five hierarchical categories which represent the five levels of the Bulgarian football pyramid with Level 1 being the top league and Level 5 being the bottom league in the system. The hierarchical format of the pyramid has promotion and relegation between leagues at different levels at the end of each cycle (season), allowing self-sustaining system of better playing teams joining the higher levels.

Throughout the years, the various levels have had different names, number of participants and structure. Generally, the top level has always been a single league, while the lower levels have consisted of a various number of divisions specified geographically and running simultaneously. For instance, up to and including season 2011-12 the second tier of Bulgarian football consisted of two leagues: East and West divisions of the Bulgarian B Professional Football Group; also, the third level continues to have four divisions (South-West, South-East, North-East, and North-West) that run in parallel.

Despite changes in the official names of the leagues the levels are commonly referred to as follows:

Level 1: A Group

Level 2: B Group

Level 3: V Group

Level 4: A Oblast Group

Level 5: B Oblast Group

As of season 2013-14 the official names and structure of the five levels of Bulgarian football are:
Level 1 - A Professional Football Group
A PFG has one division of 14 clubs in it

Level 2 - B Professional Football Group
B PFG has one division of 14 clubs in it

Level 3 - V Amateur Football Group
V AFG has four divisions - North-East with 16 clubs, North-West with 16 clubs, South-West with 16 clubs, South-East with 18 clubs

Level 4 - A Oblast Football Groups
There are forty-five (45) divisions from the different districts in Bulgaria that run in parallel, forming 45 A OFGs. The number of teams varies by division.

Level 5 - B Oblast Football Groups
There are seventeen (17) divisions from the different districts in Bulgaria running simultaneously throughout the season. A various number of teams comprises each of the 17 B OFGs

While there is an abundance of Level 4 regional groups, there is a considerably smaller number of Level 5 divisions. This is a result of the uneven number of teams in the various oblasts of the country. For example, While the Burgas Oblast can sustain four Level 5 OFGs that are funneled into one Level 4 OFG, clubs from Smolyan and Lovech are enough to form only one division at one level so these oblasts have no Level 5 OFGs. Still, some of the "provinces" such as Blagoevgrad have five Level 4 divisions, but no Level 5 oblast groups.

Regions
The list includes a categorisation of teams by region of the country. The most reliable geographical categorisation of football clubs in Bulgaria has been the division of the clubs into four regions - those of V Group: North-West, North-East, South-East, and South-West, since it has been the sole constant division since the creation of the football pyramid in 1953.

The regions' borders are the administrative borders of the state's "provinces" (oblasts) that constitute the regions.

For the North-West region the included oblasts are: Vidin Province, Montana Province, Vratsa Province, Lovech Province, Pleven Province, Gabrovo Province, and Veliko Tarnovo Province.
 Veliko Tarnovo is the administrative center of the North-West zone for V Group.

For the North-East region the included oblasts are: Razgrad Province, Ruse Province, Targovishte Province, Silistra Province, Shumen Province, Dobrich Province, and Varna Province.
 Varna is the administrative center of the North-East zone for V Group.

For the South-East region the included oblasts are: Burgas Province, Yambol Province, Sliven Province, Stara Zagora Province, Haskovo Province, Kardzhali Province, Smolyan Province, and Plovdiv Province.
 Plovdiv is the administrative center of the South-East zone for V Group.

For the South-West region the included oblasts are: Pazardzhik Province, Blagoevgrad Province, Kyustendil Province, Pernik Province, Sofia Province and Sofia - city.
 Sofia is the administrative center of the South-West zone for V Group.

All Teams

References

 
Bulgaria
Football clubs
clubs